The 2021 Austin Gilgronis season was the 4th in the clubs history since their entry to the Major League Rugby in 2017. Sam Harris was the coach of the club for first year. Bryce Campbell was the captain the club for the first year as well. The team finished the season in third in the Western Conference standings and did not qualify for the 2021 Major League Rugby playoffs.

The Gilgronis played their home matchups at Bold Stadium in Austin, Texas.

Schedule

Standings

References

Austin Gilgronis seasons
Austin
2021 in sports in Texas